In algebraic geometry, a divisorial scheme is a scheme admitting an ample family of line bundles, as opposed to an ample line bundle. In particular, a quasi-projective variety is a divisorial scheme and the notion is a generalization of "quasi-projective". The term "divisorial" refers to the fact that "the topology of these varieties is determined by their positive divisors." The class of divisorial schemes is quite large: it includes affine schemes, separated regular (noetherian) schemes and subschemes of a divisorial scheme (such as projective varieties).

Definition 
Here is the definition in SGA 6, which is a more general version of the definition of Borelli. Given a quasi-compact quasi-separated scheme X, a family of invertible sheaves  on it is said to be an ample family if the open subsets  form a base of the (Zariski) topology on X; in other words, there is an open affine cover of X consisting of open sets of such form. A scheme is then said to be divisorial if there exists such an ample family of invertible sheaves.

Properties and counterexample 
Since a subscheme of a divisorial scheme is divisorial, "divisorial" is a necessary condition for a scheme to be embedded into a smooth variety (or more generally a separated Noetherian regular scheme). To an extent, it is also a sufficient condition.

A divisorial scheme has the resolution property; i.e., a coherent sheaf is a quotient of a vector bundle. In particular, a scheme that does not have the resolution property is an example of a non-divisorial scheme.

See also 
Jouanolou's trick

References 

Algebraic geometry